Britany van Lange (born November 17, 1996 in Georgetown, Guyana) is a Guyanese swimmer. At the 2012 Summer Olympics, she competed in the Women's 100 metre freestyle, finishing in 42nd place overall in the heats, coming close to qualifying for the semifinals. Just prior to the Olympics she had attended the 2012 Carifta Swimming Championships in the Bahamas. Britany van Lange is also a cadet at USMA '19. She is very secretive and has used her Olympic experience to lead Company Athletics for Company D3 in swimming.

References

Guyanese female swimmers
Living people
Sportspeople from Georgetown, Guyana
Olympic swimmers of Guyana
Swimmers at the 2012 Summer Olympics
Guyanese female freestyle swimmers
1996 births
Swimmers at the 2014 Summer Youth Olympics
Pan American Games competitors for Guyana
Swimmers at the 2011 Pan American Games